This is a list of the islands in the Isles of Scilly.

Inhabited islands
There are five inhabited islands of the Isles of Scilly, Cornwall, United Kingdom (six if you count the tidal island of Gugh which is separated from St. Agnes at high tide).

Islands around Bryher

The following islands lie in the civil parish of Bryher, and include the group of Norrard Rocks which were designated as a Site of Special Scientific Interest in 1971. The only inhabited island in this area is Bryher itself.

Islands around St. Agnes

The following islands lie in the civil parish of St. Agnes, and include the group of Western Rocks. The only inhabited islands in this area are St Agnes and Gugh.

Islands around St. Martin's

The following islands lie in the civil parish of St. Martin's, and include the group of Eastern Isles. The only inhabited island in this area is St Martin's itself.

Islands around St. Mary's

The civil parish of St. Mary's contains the island of St Mary's itself which includes a few tidal islands which are connected at low tide.

Islands around Tresco

The following islands lie in the civil parish of Tresco. The only inhabited island in this area is Tresco itself.

References 

List of Islands
Isles of Scilly